The Frank Gehry Bridge is a bridge in Bilbao that connects Deusto and Zorrotzaurre. Its name is a tribute to Canadian-born American architect Frank Gehry, author of the Guggenheim Museum Bilbao.

References

External links

Bridges in Biscay
Buildings and structures in Bilbao
Estuary of Bilbao